{{DISPLAYTITLE:C17H21NO}}
The molecular formula C17H21NO (molar mass: 255.35 g/mol, exact mass: 255.1623 u) may refer to:

 Atomoxetine
 Diphenhydramine
 Oxifentorex
 Phenyltoloxamine
 Tofenacin

Molecular formulas